A cryptosystem is a set of cryptographic algorithms that map ciphertexts and plaintexts to each other.

Private-key cryptosystems
Private-key cryptosystems use the same key for encryption and decryption.

 Caesar cipher
 Substitution cipher 
 Enigma machine
 Data Encryption Standard 
 Twofish 
 Serpent
 Camellia
 Salsa20
 ChaCha20
 Blowfish
 CAST5
 Kuznyechik
 RC4
 3DES
 Skipjack
 Safer
 IDEA 
 Advanced Encryption Standard, also known as AES and Rijndael.

Public-key cryptosystems
Public-key cryptosystems use a public key for encryption and a private key for decryption.

 Diffie–Hellman key exchange
 RSA encryption
 Rabin cryptosystem
 Schnorr signature
 ElGamal encryption
 Elliptic-curve cryptography
 Lattice-based cryptography
 McEliece cryptosystem
 Multivariate cryptography
 Isogeny-based cryptography

References

Cryptography
Algorithms